Gers is a department of France.

Gers may also refer to:

Gers (river), in France, tributary of the Garonne
Gers (Schwalm), a river of Hesse, Germany, tributary of the Schwalm
Government Expenditure and Revenue Scotland (GERS), an annual estimate of the Scottish economy
Rangers F.C., nickname Gers, a football club in Glasgow, Scotland

People with the surname
Janick Gers (born 1957), English musician
Felix Gers, professor of computer science at Beuth University Berlin
Ilke Gers (born 1981), retired New Zealand tennis player
Gers Pardoel (born 1981), Dutch rapper

See also
Lac de Gers, Haute-Savoie, France
Ger (disambiguation)